The Ali Fahiye Geedi Primary and Intermediary School is an educational institution in Qandala, situated in the northeastern Puntland region of Somalia. The institution serves about 200 students.

Overview
Ali Fahiye Geedi Primary and Intermediary School was established in the early 20th century, during the colonial period in Italian Somaliland. The Supreme Revolutionary Council (SRC) later launched a large renovation project of the facility. In 2009, the school again underwent major reconstruction and refurbishment.

Funding
Funding for the operation and rehabilitation of the institution is provided by the Noor Foundation Somalia.

Alumni
Past alumni of the school include many prominent members of the Qandala community, who have held positions both in government and major private institutions.

See also
List of schools in Somalia

Schools in Somalia